Towle may refer to:

 Towle (surname)
 Towle, California, a community in Placer County
 Towle Silversmiths, one of the most prestigious silver manufacturers in the United States